Bartlett is a village in, and the county seat of,  Wheeler County, Nebraska, United States.  The population was 117 at the 2010 census.

History
Bartlett was founded in the 1880s. It was named for Ezra Bartlett Mitchell, the original owner of the town site.

Geography
Bartlett is located at  (41.885125, -98.552439).

Demographics

2010 census
At the 2010 census there were 117 people, 59 households, and 30 families in the village. The racial makeup of the village was 100.0% White.
Of the 59 households 20.3% had children under the age of 18 living with them, 42.4% were married couples living together, 5.1% had a female householder with no husband present, 3.4% had a male householder with no wife present, and 49.2% were non-families. 45.8% of households were one person and 15.3% were one person aged 65 or older. The average household size was 1.98 and the average family size was 2.87.

The median age in the village was 42.2 years. 23.9% of residents were under the age of 18; 3.5% were between the ages of 18 and 24; 24.8% were from 25 to 44; 33.2% were from 45 to 64; and 14.5% were 65 or older. The gender makeup of the village was 50.4% male and 49.6% female.

2000 census
At the 2000 census there were 128 people, 57 households, and 33 families in the village. The population density was 903.5 people per square mile (353.0/km). There were 68 housing units at an average density of 480.0 per square mile (187.5/km). The racial makeup of the village was 100.00% White.
Of the 57 households 26.3% had children under the age of 18 living with them, 50.9% were married couples living together, 7.0% had a female householder with no husband present, and 40.4% were non-families. 38.6% of households were one person and 15.8% were one person aged 65 or older. The average household size was 2.25 and the average family size was 3.00.

The age distribution was 25.8% under the age of 18, 8.6% from 18 to 24, 22.7% from 25 to 44, 24.2% from 45 to 64, and 18.8% 65 or older. The median age was 41 years. For every 100 females, there were 82.9 males. For every 100 females age 18 and over, there were 90.0 males.

The median household income was $33,250, and the median family income  was $41,875. Males had a median income of $25,625 versus $15,625 for females. The per capita income for the village was $18,025. There were no families and 2.5% of the population living below the poverty line, including no under eighteens and 13.0% of those over 64.

References

Villages in Nebraska
Villages in Wheeler County, Nebraska
County seats in Nebraska